Noel Everingham Sainsbury, Jr. (June 11, 1884-1955) was an author of various children's adventure and mystery novels during the late 1920s and the 1930s.

He served as a naval aviator during World War I and retained active connections with the naval reserve.  He served in the Navy during World War II and retired with the rank of lieutenant commander.

Educated as an engineer, Sainsbury began writing juvenile fiction in the late 1920s, producing the Great Ace and Bill Bolton, Naval Aviator series under his own name and contributing to the Dorothy Dixon and Malay Jungle series under various pseudonyms, including under the maiden name of his second wife.  He also wrote some sports-themed juvenile books, including Gridiron Grit and The Fighting Five, as a part of his Champion Sport Stories series.

Sainsbury married twice, first Elizabeth (Bessie) Slade from whom he divorced, and then in 1926 Dorothy Wayne Illick.  He had a child by each wife.

Works
 Billy Smith, Exploring Ace, (1928)
 Billy Smith, Secret Service Ace, (1932)
 Billy Smith, Mystery Ace, (1932)
 Billy Smith, Trail Eater Ace, (1933)
 Billy Bolton and the Flying Fish, (1933)
 Billy Smith, Shanghaied Ace, (1934)
 The Fighting Five, (1934)
 Cracker Stanton, (1934)
 Gridiron Grit, (1934)

As Charles Lawton
 Jungle Menace, (1937)
 Ros Hackney, Halfback, (1937)
 Home Run Hennessey, (1940)
 Winning Forward Pass, (1940)
 Touchdown To Victory, (1942)
 
Source:

References

External links
 
 
 
 

1884 births
1955 deaths
20th-century American male writers
20th-century American novelists
American children's writers
American male novelists
American mystery writers
United States Navy personnel of World War II
American World War I pilots
Novelists from New York (state)
Writers from New York City